The Central States Collegiate Hockey League (CSCHL) is Division I ACHA level hockey-college athletic conference.  The CSCHL is in its 51st season of existence and is one of the top ranked ACHA leagues. It currently has 4 member teams in the Midwestern United States.

Format
League teams play a 20-game league schedule, plus additional regular season games against non-league opponents. Following the regular season, the league holds a Championship Tournament. The CSCHL Regular Season champion team is awarded an automatic bid to the annual ACHA Men's Division I National Tournament.

History
The league began in 1970 with Chicago State University, Illinois State University and Iowa State University as founding members. The following season the league expanded to 24 teams in 3 divisions making the CSCHL the premier ice hockey conference in the midwest. Joining the CSCHL included Bradley University, Drake University, Illinois Benedictine University, Illinois Institute of Technology, Lewis University, Northeastern Illinois University, and Western Illinois University. The University of Illinois joined shortly after in 1974. The league saw great expansion in the early 1990s when the University of Michigan-Dearborn joined after operating as an NAIA varsity program. Ohio University followed in 1993 and Kent State University joined in 1994 after the university dropped NCAA hockey. Following the 2003 season, UW-Whitewater departed & dropped down to play ACHA D2. In 2004, Robert Morris University-Illinois joined the league, followed by Lindenwood University in 2006. After the 2008 season, Saint Louis University departed to play at the ACHA Division II level. At the conclusion of the 2009–2010 season, Eastern Michigan University, Michigan–Dearborn, and Western Michigan University left to join the new Great Lakes Collegiate Hockey League. The CSCHL added Indiana University, who joins the league for the 2010–2011 season, after transitioning from ACHA II. Kent State departed for the GLCHL at the conclusion of the 2011–12 season. Indiana University rejoined the Great Midwest Hockey League (GMHL) in the 2014–15 season to once again compete at the Division II level. During the 2019–20 season, Robert Morris Illinois merged with erstwhile non-hockey Roosevelt University. The hockey program was retained through the merger process of the universities and athletics departments and has played under the Roosevelt Lakers program beginning in the 2020-21 season. After the 2021–22 season, Lindenwood moved up its men's hockey team to NCAA Division I status and therefore left both the league and the ACHA.

Current members

Membership timeline

Former teams
Northeastern Illinois University folded hockey program
University of Wisconsin–Milwaukee folded hockey program.
Kent State University moved to GLCHL
Eastern Michigan University moved to GLCHL
University of Michigan–Dearborn moved to GLCHL
Western Michigan University moved to GLCHL
Saint Louis University dropped to ACHA Div II
University of Wisconsin–Whitewater dropped to ACHA Div II
University at Buffalo moved to ECHL
Marquette University dropped to ACHA Div II
University of Toledo dropped to ACHA Div II
Purdue University dropped to ACHA Div II
University of Minnesota dropped to ACHA Div II
University of Notre Dame moved to NCAA Div I WCHA
University of Alabama in Huntsville moved to NCAA Div II, now Div. I in WCHA
Northwestern University dropped to ACHA Div II
St. Norbert College moved to NCAA Div III Northern Collegiate Hockey Association
University of Missouri dropped to ACHA Div II
Illinois State University dropped to ACHA Div II
University of Illinois at Chicago moved to NCAA Div I CCHA, folded hockey program.
Chicago State University folded hockey program.
Indiana University dropped to ACHA Div II
Robert Morris University merged with Roosevelt University in 2020.
Lindenwood University moved to NCAA Div I independent in 2022.

Conference arenas

References

External links
 https://web.archive.org/web/20070910195641/http://www.cschl.com/

ACHA Division 1 conferences
1970 establishments in the United States
Sports leagues established in 1970
Organizations based in Michigan